Joseph Han Zhihai (born 1966) is a Chinese Catholic priest and Archbishop of the Roman Catholic Archdiocese of Lanzhou since 2003.

Biography
Han was born in China in 1966. He was ordained a priest in 1994. He succeeded Archbishop Philip Yang Libo, who was the first Chinese to be Archbishop of the Roman Catholic Archdiocese of Lanzhou, from 1981 to 1998. He was a leader in the underground church and had been in prison for over 30 years. After his death, Han became administrator of the Roman Catholic Archdiocese of Lanzhou. Han was ordained Archbishop in 2003 by Xinjiang Underground Bishop Paul Xie Tingzhe. In late September 2018, Han was elected chairman of the Lanzhou Patriotic Catholic Association, a branch of the CCP-supported Catholic Patriotic Association.

References

1966 births
Living people
21st-century Roman Catholic bishops in China